Senator Newton may refer to:

Blake T. Newton (1889–1977), Virginia State Senate
Buck Newton (born 1968), North Carolina State Senate
Charles D. Newton (1861–1930), New York State Senate
Cherubusco Newton (1848–1910), Louisiana State Senate
Eben Newton (1795–1885), Ohio State Senate
Ernie Newton (politician) (born 1956), Connecticut State Senate
Paul Newton (politician) (born 1960), North Carolina State Senate
Thomas Willoughby Newton (1804–1853), Arkansas State Senate